GF Securitiesis a securities firm in China which engages in the operation of large-scale comprehensive securities broking and trading services. The company was founded in 1991 and is headquartered in Guangzhou, China.

History

The securities department of China Guangfa Bank was established on April 9, 1991. On August 26, 1999, the firm was spun-off as a separate company. On July 25, 2001, the firm changed its name to GF Securities.

GF Securities listed on the Shenzhen Stock Exchange on February 12, 2010 via a reverse takeover by Yan Bian Road Construction Co., Ltd.

On August 5, 2015, GF Securities paid $40 million to purchase Natixis' commodities trading unit.

On April 10, 2015, the firm listed on the Hong Kong Stock Exchange.

GF Securities is a member of the SZSE 100 Index which consists of the top 100 A-share listed companies listing and trading on the Shenzhen Stock Exchange ranked by total market capitalization

Subsidiaries 

E Fund Management, one of China's largest asset management companies is considered a subsidiary of GF Securities which holds 22.65% of its shares.

See also 
 Securities industry in China

References

External links
 Official site

Companies listed on the Shenzhen Stock Exchange
Companies listed on the Hong Kong Stock Exchange
Financial services companies established in 1991
Companies based in Guangzhou
Investment banks in China
Financial services companies of China
H shares